Ethnikos Filippiada Football Club is a Greek football club, based in Filippiada.

The association was founded in 1948. In 2008, they were promoted to Gamma Ethniki and played for 10 years until the 2017-2018 season.

Current squad
2015-16 season

References

Football clubs in Epirus
Association football clubs established in 1935
Gamma Ethniki clubs